is the seventh album by the Japanese girl idol group Berryz Kobo, released on March 30, 2011 in Japan on the record label Piccolo Town.  As with previous albums, it is entirely written and produced by Tsunku.  There are a total of ten songs on the album, including the title tracks from three previously released hit singles: "Maji Bomber!!", "Shining Power", and "Heroine ni Narō ka!".

The album 7 Berryz Times was available in two editions: regular (PKCP-5182) and limited (PKCP-5180/1). The limited edition came with a DVD that included a live performance of "Heroine ni Narō ka!" and a documentary on how the album jacket was made.  The album debuted at number 3 in the Oricon Daily Albums Chart and ranked 10th for the week.

Track listing

Charts

References

External links 
 Profile on the Up-Front Works website 
 Profile on the Hello! Project website 
 Limited Edition, profile on the Oricon website 
 Regular Edition, profile on the Oricon website 

2011 albums
Berryz Kobo albums